Ian Burden (born 27 May 1944) is an English former amateur footballer who played as a striker in the Football League for York City, and in non-League football for Poppleton Road Old Boys, Dunnington, Ashfield, Rowntrees and Shepherds.

References

1944 births
Living people
Footballers from Bradford
English footballers
Association football forwards
York City F.C. players
Nestlé Rowntree F.C. players
English Football League players